Takaroa, Taka-roa or Takapua, is an atoll in the Tuamotu group in French Polynesia.

Fine pearls, including black pearls, were obtained in the lagoon of Takaroa.

Geographically Takaroa is part of the King George Islands (Iles du Roi Georges) subgroup, which includes Ahe, Manihi, Takapoto, Takaroa and Tikei.

Takaroa Atoll has 674 inhabitants (2017). The main village is Teavaroa.

History
The first recorded Europeans to arrive to Takaroa were Dutch explorers Jacob le Maire and Willem Schouten on 14 April 1616 during their Pacific journey. They called this atoll "Sondergrond Island".

Captain Cook visited the island in 1774.

Takaroa territorial airport was inaugurated in 1986.

Geography

Climate
Takaroa has a tropical monsoon climate (Köppen climate classification Am).

Administration
The commune of Takaroa consists of the islands of Takaroa, Takapoto and Tikei.

See also
Takaroa Airport

References

Atoll names
le Maire & Schouten

External links
Atoll list (in French)

Atolls of the Tuamotus
Communes of French Polynesia